James Kenny VC (1824 – 3 October 1862) was a recipient of the Victoria Cross, the highest and most prestigious award for gallantry in the face of the enemy that can be awarded to British and Commonwealth forces.

Details
He was approximately 33 years old, and a private in the 53rd Regiment of Foot (later, the King's Shropshire Light Infantry), British Army during the Indian Mutiny when the following deed on 16 November 1857 at the assault on the Secundra Bagh during the Relief of Lucknow led to the award of the Victoria Cross:

He was killed in action, Mooltan, British India, on 2 October 1862.

References

Burial details

1824 births
1862 deaths
19th-century Irish people
Irish soldiers in the British Army
King's Shropshire Light Infantry soldiers
British military personnel killed in action in India
Indian Rebellion of 1857 recipients of the Victoria Cross
Military personnel from Dublin (city)
Irish recipients of the Victoria Cross
British Army recipients of the Victoria Cross
Burials in India